Lupinus macbrideanus is a species of legume in the family Fabaceae. It is found only in Peru.

References

macbrideanus
Endemic flora of Peru
Vulnerable plants
Taxonomy articles created by Polbot